The Gambling Sex is a 1932 American drama film directed by Fred C. Newmeyer and starring Ruth Hall, Grant Withers and Maston Williams.

Synopsis 
A wealthy young woman becomes addicted to gambling, suffering increasingly heavy losses.

Cast
 Ruth Hall as Sheila Tracy
 Grant Withers as Bill Foster
 Maston Williams as Ralph Jordan
 John St. Polis as John Tracy
 Jean Porter as Daisy
 James Eagles as Sandy Lane - Jockey (as Jimmy Eagles)
 Murdock MacQuarrie as Thompson
 Ted Adams as Mason - Manager of Gambling Club
 Jack Cheatham as Gambling Club Cashier
 Henry Hall as Doctor 
 Duke R. Lee as Roulette Croupier
 George Morrell as Night Club Waiter

References

Bibliography
Parish, James Robert & Pitts, Michael R. Film directors: a guide to their American films. Scarecrow Press, 1974.
 Pitts, Michael R. Poverty Row Studios, 1929-1940. McFarland & Company, 2005.

External links
 

1932 films
1932 drama films
American drama films
Films directed by Fred C. Newmeyer
Films set in Florida
Films about gambling
1930s English-language films
1930s American films